Greg Liter was a player in the National Football League for the Philadelphia Eagles and San Francisco 49ers in 1987 as a defensive end. He played at the collegiate level at Iowa State University.

Biography
Liter was born on December 31, 1963, in Wausau, Wisconsin. He attended high school in Mosinee, Wisconsin.

See also
List of Philadelphia Eagles players

References

Players of American football from Wisconsin
Sportspeople from Wausau, Wisconsin
Philadelphia Eagles players
San Francisco 49ers players
Iowa State Cyclones football players
American football defensive ends
1963 births
Living people